Mohammadabad-e Olya may refer to:
 Mohammadabad-e Olya, Kerman
 Mohammadabad-e Olya, Razavi Khorasan
 Mohammadabad-e Olya, South Khorasan